The Campeonato Brasileiro Feminino Sub-17, is the official Brazilian national football tournament for U-17 women's teams. From 2019 to 2021 it was disputed as Sub-16 (under-16) category.

List of champions

Following there are all the championship editions:

Sub-16 (Under-16)

Sub-17 (Under-17)

Titles by club

See also
 Campeonato Brasileiro Feminino
 Campeonato Brasileiro Feminino Sub-20

References